Salik (In Arabic: سالك meaning "clear and moving") is the name given to the electronic toll road system in Dubai, United Arab Emirates, which is based on RFID technology, automatically deducting a fee when a toll gate is passed under. The Salik toll was launched by Dubai's Dubai Roads and Transport Authority (RTA) on 1 July 2007.

Motorists are required to buy a 100 AED pre-paid card that is affixed to their windscreens. 4 AED ($1.08) is deducted from their account each time they pass through a toll gate. Initially, there were two toll gates, one near Al Garhoud Bridge, and one near Mall of the Emirates on Sheikh Zayed Road, but later in September 2008 two more gates were installed on Maktoum Bridge and at Al Safa.

History

On 9 September 2008, two more SALIK gates were instituted, one at Safa Park and another at Al Maktoum Bridge. The Roads and Transport Authority of Dubai (RTA) explained how the new gates will work in conjunction with existing gates. Once a motorist passes through Al Barsha toll gate, he will be charged  Dh4. But if he continues his journey, does not take a right or left turn or does not get stuck in traffic and passes through the Al Safa toll gate, he will not be charged. But if the motorist continues his journey and passes through the Al Maktoum toll gate, he will again be charged Dh4. Moreover, if the motorist, during the same journey, passes through the Al Garhoud toll gate, he will again be charged Dh4. The Al Safa toll gate will be free of charge if the motorist is on a single continuous journey. This was facility of single SALIK was however discontinued in 2017.

The Al Maktoum Bridge toll gate is free when the Floating Bridge is closed during night for traffic to ease the process for motorists.

SALIK gates were subsequently installed at two additional locations, two at both the sides of Al Mamzar Intersection on Al-Ittihad road and one at the Dubai Airport Tunnel. These were activated on 15 April 2013.

The maximum charge per day per car using the tolled roads was 24 AED ($6.48). However, as of July 1, 2013 this has been scrapped and there is no longer an upper limit that vehicles will be charged.  Alternative routes include Business Bay Crossing, Floating Bridge (close to Al Maktoum Bridge; connects Al Ittihad Road (in Deira) with Al Riyadh Street (in Bur Dubai)), Al Khail Road, and Sheikh Mohammad Bin Zayed Road.

Safa Park toll gate and Al Barsha Gates were separated on 19 February 2017 and motorists are now charged Dhs 4 independently on both the toll gates.

Another SALIK gate was added on Sheikh Zayed Road, near Energy Metro Station close to Ibn Battuta Mall.  The gate became operational on 24 October 2018.

As of December 2018 there are total 8 SALIK Toll Gates in Dubai.

Technology
SALIK tags are 'passive' RFID tags. 'Passive' tags are powered by the transceiver in the toll gate and no battery is required for the tag itself. Radio frequency identification (RFID) is an automatic identification method, relying on storing and remotely retrieving data using devices called RFID tags or transponders.

An RFID tag is an object that can be applied to or incorporated into a product, animal, or person for the purpose of identification using radio waves. Some tags can be read from several meters away and beyond the line of sight of the reader.

Advantages of the Salik system
The use of this technology enables the traffic to continue flowing through the toll gates as opposed to vehicles having to stop and pay with cash as on more traditional toll gates. The fees are currently relatively low, when compared to schemes in other major cities such as the London congestion charge.

Criticism of Salik

Even though the tolls started on July 1, 2007, many commuters have criticised the RTA for implementing Salik too soon, since the traffic on alternative routes has worsened. The initial problem of SMS alerts not being received by customers was found to be a result of incompatible mobile phone configuration. Now the SMS alerts have become a critical component of the service and ensure that the customers receive their account information more accurately.

For some the largest area of concern of Salik is that the Salik tag is tied to the car, instead of the purchaser. This means that a commuter from Abu Dhabi, or a neighbouring Gulf country who drives into Dubai will be required to purchase a sticker which they must leave on the windscreen for the life of the car. The traveller who might come into Dubai once a year or less, will have to keep the orange sticker on the windscreen permanently, just in case they decide to return to Dubai. However, for most vehicles the Salik tag cannot be seen from within the vehicle as it is obscured by the rear view mirror.

There was previous criticism of how the Salik charge used to be applied to taxi fares, but the Dubai RTA has now exempted taxis from the toll (see below).

The Dubai RTA have yet to clarify where the Salik tag should be placed on motorcycles which do not have windscreens.

When Salik was launched on July 1, 2007, some of the advertised alternate routes were not yet completed. Floating Bridge opened to the public on July 16, 2007, two weeks after Salik began.

The Salik toll system has received mixed reviews. Those travelling on Al Garhoud Bridge seem happy that it is no longer congested, while others on Sheikh Zayed Road are dismayed by the number of exits before and after that exit having led to an influx of traffic into neighbouring residential areas of the Springs, Greens and Al Barsha communities.

Dubai taxis

All Dubai taxis are charging the Salik fees since February 2013. Salik is automatically added to the taxi fare.

References

External links
 Salik official website
 Gulf News — coverage of Salik toll
 Salik — The Dubai Road Toll — ArabianBusiness.com
 Guide2Dubai.com, "Salik Road Toll System in Dubai"
 Maps of toll gate locations

2007 introductions
Transport in Dubai
Economy of Dubai
Road congestion charge schemes
Electronic toll collection